The Soviet Union's 1970 nuclear test series was a group of 16 nuclear tests conducted in 1970. These tests  followed the 1969 Soviet nuclear tests series and preceded the 1971 Soviet nuclear tests series.

References

1970 in military history
1970 in the Soviet Union
Explosions in 1970
1970